Bupleurum fruticosum or shrubby hare's-ear is a species of flowering plant in the family Apiaceae.
It is endemic to the Mediterranean region. It lives in sunny hills, walls and rocky places.

Description 
It is in flower from June to September, and the seeds ripen from August to October. The flowers are hermaphrodite (have both male and female organs) and are pollinated by wasps. The plant is self-fertile. It is noted for attracting wildlife.

Cultivation and uses 
It grows in any well-drained soil in a warm sheltered site with full sun. It propagates by seed in containers in a cold frame in spring, and semi-ripe cuttings can also be rooted in summer.

This species makes a very good wind-shelter hedge in exposed maritime positions, though it is slow growing.

References 

fruticosum
Plants described in 1753
Taxa named by Carl Linnaeus